The Yugoslavia national rugby union team used to represent Yugoslavia at Rugby union until the 1990s.

History

SFR Yugoslavia made their debut as early as 1968 against a Romanian XV, losing 3 points to 11 in World Youth Sports Games in Stara Zagora (Bulgaria). They made their full Test debut on 29.December 1968, in FIRA competition against Italy. Till the 1991 SFR Yugoslavia national rugby team played in total 66 Test games and regularly participated in FIRA Nations Cup and FIRA Trophy. The last game SFR Yugoslavia played in April 1991 against Czechoslovakia and won the first time against this opponent.

The best result SFR Yugoslavia gained in season 1979–1980. After wins against The Netherlands and Sweden, drawn against West Germany and defeat versus Spain SFR Yugoslavia finished second in B group, eight in total ranking in FIRA competition.

National managers were Branimir Alaupovic from Zagreb (twice), Mihovil Radja from Split,Dusan Novakov from Pancevo, Marko Protega from Split and Suad Kapetanovic  from Zenica.

Yugoslavia affiliated to the IRB in 1988 , and played in the 1988 World Cup qualification.

Due to the links between many Yugoslav and New Zealand families, the side also toured there.

Notable players

The longest serving and the most capped players were Nikola Stancevic and Dragan Kesic from Dinamo Pancevo, Ante Zekan,Branko Radic,Damir Buzov and Vinko Labrovic from Nada Split, Tihomir Vranesevic and Dubravko Gerovac from Zagreb, Damir Uzunovic, Sreto Cadjo, Nasir Vehabovic and Jasmin Deljkic from Celik Zenica, Drago Lulic from Energoinvest Makarska, Zlatko Zver from Koloys LJubljana, Dragan Grujic from Partizan Belgrade.

In second half of the 1980s, many SFR Yugoslavia representatives came to France to play rugby as semi-pro players in lower-level clubs. Drago Lulic from RK Energoinvest Makarska, as first, joined in 1986 Montchanin. In 1987, Midi-Olympique rugby magazine  voted Lulic as The Player of the Month November. Lulic also was voted twice as Player of the week. In season 1987–1988, Damir Uzunovic, Ibrahim Hasagic and Pero Barisic joined Lulic in Montchanin Rugby Sportif. Lulic later played for Union Sportive Bourg-en-Bresse and Rhone-Alpes selection and finished career 1996 in Lons les Saunier.

Damir Dimitrijevic, Nikola Scepanovic, Renato Jukic and Muharem Gafurovic played for RC Dijon, Jasmin Deljkic for Chalon Rugby, Pavle Grubisic, Vinko Labrovic and Dusan Jerotijevic for Plaisir Rugby, Boro Karaman for Union Sportive Bourg-en-Bresse.

The highest individual achievement made DZoni Mandic, 1.95 m and 110 kg, lock cum backrow player. After a couple seasons in  Club Olympique Creusot Bourgogne he joined Grenoble and in 1993 played in finale of French Rugby Championship. He played for Nice Rugby Club, too.

Successor teams 
The rugby teams of Yugoslavia's successor states have had varying success, but none have yet qualified for the World Cup.

Test games 

In total 66 test games (20 won, 2 drawn, 44 lost)

Overall

SFR Yugoslavia XV (unofficial games)

Managers (Test games only)

Most capped players (Test games only)

ENC
The following successor teams are in the European Nations Cup:

 Bosnia and Herzegovina national rugby union team
 Croatia national rugby union team
 Serbia national rugby union team
 Slovenia national rugby union team
 Montenegro national rugby union team

References

External links 
 European Nations Cup (rugby union)

Bibliography 
 Proslo je 30 godina,anniversary book,  1985, published by SFR Yugoslavia Rugby Union
 20 godina Ragbi kluba Zagreb, 1984, published by RK Zagreb
 10 godina ragbija na Makarskoj rivijeri 1968–1978, published by RK Energoinvest Makarska
 50 godina Ragbi kluba Nada 1959–2009, published by RK Nada Split

Rugby
Rugby union in Yugoslavia
European national rugby union teams
Former national rugby union teams
Multinational rugby union teams